Celia Quansah (born 25 October 1996) is an English rugby sevens player. She was selected as a member of the Great Britain women's national rugby sevens team for the 2020 Summer Olympics.

Her partner is Team GB international teammate Megan Jones.

Biography
Quansah was born to an English mother and a Ghanaian father, and grew up in Twickenham. She participated in athletics, winning the long jump event at the 2011 School Games, and in heptathlon represented England internationally, and competed at the British Championships against Jessica Ennis-Hill. Whilst at university, she took up rugby. After playing for six months, she was invited to join the England Sevens programme for 2018/19, and played for the winning Great Britain team at the 2019 Rugby Europe Women's Sevens Olympic Qualifying Tournament.

She was selected as a member of the Great Britain women's national rugby sevens team for the 2020 Summer Olympics. She was named in the England squad for the 2022 Rugby World Cup Sevens – Women's tournament held in Cape Town, South Africa in September 2022.

Personal life 
Quansah is openly lesbian, and is in a same-sex relationship with her England 7s team mate Megan Jones. The couple represented Great Britain together at the 2020 Tokyo Olympics.

References

External links

1995 births
Living people
Lesbian sportswomen
LGBT rugby union players
LGBT Black British people
English LGBT sportspeople
Female rugby sevens players
English rugby sevens players
Olympic rugby sevens players of Great Britain
Rugby sevens players at the 2020 Summer Olympics
21st-century LGBT people